The Moore Gypsy or Birmingham Guild BG 100/12 and BG 135 is an early all-metal single-seat glider designed in the UK in the late 1960s. Several longer span variants were produced by various manufacturers. The first BG 135 was still flying in 2011.

Design and development

The Moore Gypsy is a small glider, all metal apart from a GRP nose, designed by L. P. Moore, J. Gibson and K. Emslie and constructed by the Birmingham Guild Ltd. It has shoulder mounted, cost-saving wings of constant chord with square tips. Though the prototype had a 12 m span wing, longer span variants were envisaged from the outset.

The wings are light alloy structures with polyurethane foam cores and 0.0124 in (315 μm) light alloy skins. Ailerons and flaps occupy the whole of the trailing edge. The Gypsy has a constant chord V-tail constructed in the same manner as the wing. Its fuselage behind the nose is an oval section metal monocoque with a long, smooth, bulged canopy over the single seat cockpit that rejoins the fuselage profile. There is a single, semi-protruding fixed mono wheel under the wing and a small tailwheel.

The first Gypsy, the 12.0 m span BG 100/12, made its first flight from Pendeford airfield near Wolverhampton on 7 April 1970, piloted by Derek Piggott. A 13.46 m (44 ft 3.5 in) span version was first flown on 30 May 1971.  Known as the BG 100/13.5, it was a rebuild of the sole BG 100/12; as well as the new wings, which were fitted with extended trailing edge air brakes, it had an increased span tailplane of higher aspect ratio.

The first pre-production Gypsy, the BG 135, flew in March 1972.  It differed from the earlier versions chiefly in its wing construction, having the foam-stabilised thin skin of the BG 100s replaced by an aluminium alloy skinned D-box leading edge, based on the main spar, and with fabric covering between main and rear spars.  The best glide angle of the BG 135 is 33:1. It gained a Certificate of Airworthiness in July 1972.  After demonstrations at the British National Gliding Championships, held from 27 May to 4 June 1972, the BG 135 was loaned to several Clubs for evaluation.  Following some minor modifications, production of a batch of seven was prepared.

This limited production by The Birmingham Guild was later taken over by Yorkshire Sailplanes as the YS 55 Consort.

The Swales SD3-15 was a further development of the design, with a 15 m (49 ft 2.5 in) span, making its first flight in July 1975. The Swales SD3-15T was a further, late 1976, revision with an all-moving T-tail fitted with anti-balance tabs.

Operational history
At least one example has had an extended active life. The first BG 135, Certificate of Airworthiness BGA 1741, competed at the Inter-services Regional Glider Competition held at Hullavington Airfield in August 1998, 26 years after its first competitive appearance. BGA 1741 was recorded at RAF Keevil in 2009. In 2011 it was privately owned and based at Lasham Airfield.

Variants

Moore Gypsy or (Birmingham Guild BG 100/12)
Original version, 12 m span, 1970.
BG 100/13.5
13.5 m span prototype, rebuilt BG 100/12, 1971.
BG 135, later Yorkshire Sailplanes YS 55 Consort
Production 13.5 m span version, 1972. 7 built.
Swales SD3-15
15 m span development, first flown March 1975. 6 built by 1982.
Swales SD3-15T, first flown December 1976.
T-tail version of Swales SD3-15, 1977.

Specifications (Moore Gypsy/BG 100/12)

References

External links
Wortmann FX61-168 airfoil
Image of BG 135 over Grisedale Pass

1970s British sailplanes
Shoulder-wing aircraft
V-tail aircraft
Aircraft first flown in 1970